

190001–190100 

|-id=026
| 190026 Iskorosten || 2004 QJ || Iskorosten was the capital of the Drevlyany tribe in the times of Kiev Rus || 
|-id=057
| 190057 Nakagawa ||  || Nakagawa River (Naka River), named after the former Japanese city of Nakagawa, originates in the Turugi mountain range and flows for about 125 km in Tokushima prefecture || 
|}

190101–190200 

|-id=139
| 190139 Hansküng ||  || Hans Küng (born 1928) is a Swiss theologian and essayist, and professor emeritus of theology at the Ecumenical University of Tübingen. || 
|}

190201–190300 

|-id=283
| 190283 Schielicke ||  || Reinhard E. Schielicke (born 1940) is a German engineer who worked in astronomy as an associate of the University Observatory of Jena. || 
|}

190301–190400 

|-id=310
| 190310 De Martin || 1997 TW || Davide De Martin (born 1971), Italian amateur astronomer, author and popularizer of astronomy || 
|-id=333
| 190333 Jirous ||  || Ivan Martin Jirous (1944–2011), Czech poet, art historian, frontman of the rock group The Plastic People of the Universe || 
|}

190401–190500 

|-bgcolor=#f2f2f2
| colspan=4 align=center | 
|}

190501–190600 

|-id=504
| 190504 Hermanottó || 2000 HE || Ottó Herman (1835–1914), a Hungarian zoologist, ethnographer, mineralogist, archaeologist, journalist, renowned as the "last polyhistor of Hungary". || 
|}

190601–190700 

|-id=617
| 190617 Alexandergerst ||  || Geophysicist Alexander Gerst (born 1976) was the third German astronaut on board the International Space Station. || 
|}

190701–190800 

|-id=710
| 190710 Marktapley ||  || Mark B. Tapley (born 1962) is an Institute Engineer at Southwest Research Institute, who served as the Payload Systems Engineer for the New Horizons Mission to Pluto. || 
|}

190801–190900 

|-bgcolor=#f2f2f2
| colspan=4 align=center | 
|}

190901–191000 

|-bgcolor=#f2f2f2
| colspan=4 align=center | 
|}

References 

190001-191000